Hedemora SK is a Swedish hockey club located in the town of Hedemora in Dalarna. The club's A-team currently competes in the 1C-group of Division 1, the third tier of Swedish hockey.

External links
Official website
Profile on Eliteprospects.com

Ice hockey teams in Sweden
Ice hockey teams in Dalarna County